The Jakarta Outer Ring Road (abbreviated JORR) is a tolled ring road circling Jakarta, Indonesia.

Sections

Fee

Exits 

Notes: Direction of the toll road is in looping manner.

See also

 Jakarta Outer Ring Road 2
Jakarta Inner Ring Road
Jakarta Elevated Toll Road
 Transport in Indonesia

External links
PT Jasa Marga website
PT JLJ website

References

Toll roads in Java
Transport in Jakarta
Roads of Jakarta
Ring roads in Indonesia